Juicy! was a Philippine entertainment news program that premiered on August 11, 2008 on TV5. Hosted by Alex Gonzaga, IC Mendoza, Cristy Fermin and Shalala, the show features entertainment news, trivia, fan features, and interviews that highlight the Philippine entertainment industry. It was aired weeknights at 12:00 am to 12:30 am until cancellation on August 3, 2012 just 8 days before their 4th anniversary.

History

2008–2009
Newly branded TV5 unleashed its showbiz talk show last 2008, hosted by Alex Gonzaga. The goal of the show, which was then a 30-minute program airing every morning, is to provide allegedly unbiased entertainment news to the viewers unlike entertainment shows in rival networks ABS-CBN and GMA Network. Later that year, the late and great Inday Badiday's grandchild, IC Mendoza, was chosen to co-host the show with Gonzaga. Viewers of the program, however, note that the shows lambasts stars from the two larger networks and only promotes Kapatid, demonstrating an inconsistency on the premise of "lack of bias".

2010–2012: "Juicy", now spicier and juicier!
Now that TV5 has gotten bigger and better, with new upcoming shows and bigger showbiz names joining the station, juicy! has also been busy reinventing itself. The daily showbiz talk show is now spicier with talk show hosts Mo Twister and Cristy Fermin joining the fold. Mo and Cristy got entangled in a nasty verbal feud back in 2006 over Mo's controversial "40 Forbidden Questions" that he asks to showbiz celebrities guesting on his radio show "Good Times with Mo". Incidentally, the two hosts also headline TV5's weekly Sunday showbiz talk show "Paparazzi" with Dolly Anne Carvajal and former The Buzz co-host Ruffa Gutierrez joining them.

Later on the almost everyday Guest Panel of the show, Shalala was hired as a regular panel of the show because of his comedic act and his Bonggang Blind Items.

It was cancelled along with its weekend "version", Paparazzi but replaced with Ang Latest starting August 4, 2012.

Hosts

Final hosts
Alex Gonzaga (2008–2012)
IC Mendoza (2008–2012)
Cristy Fermin (2010–2012)
Shalala (2010–2012)

Guest hosts
Jose Javier Reyes
Gladys Reyes
Divine Lee
Nelita "Aposing" Balbuena

Former host
Mo Twister (2010–2011)
Paco & Gundito (2012)

Awards and recognitions
In the recent 25th Annual Consumers' Quality Awards, "Juicy" was adjudged as Best Entertainment Talk Show. It was the show's first award after airing for less than a year on TV. Hosts Alex Gonzaga and IC Mendoza also bagged respective awards as Best Female Talk Show Host and Best Male Talk Show Host.

See also
List of programs aired by TV5 (Philippine TV network)

References

External links
Official Website

2008 Philippine television series debuts
2012 Philippine television series endings
TV5 (Philippine TV network) original programming
Philippine television talk shows
Entertainment news shows in the Philippines
Filipino-language television shows